Hastanectes is an extinct genus of a plesiosaurian with possible pliosaurid affinities known from the Early Cretaceous Wadhurst Clay Formation (Valanginian stage) of the United Kingdom. It contains a single species, Hastanectes valdensis, which was originally thought to be a species of Cimoliasaurus.

See also

 List of plesiosaur genera
 Timeline of plesiosaur research

References

Early Cretaceous plesiosaurs of Europe
Fossil taxa described in 2012
Fossils of Great Britain
Taxa named by Darren Naish
Sauropterygian genera